The Our Lady of the Pillar Parish Church, commonly known as the Santa Cruz Church and also designated as the Archdiocesan Shrine of the Blessed Sacrament, is a baroque Roman Catholic parish church in the district of Santa Cruz, Manila, Philippines. It was built when the arrabal (suburb) of Santa Cruz was established by the Jesuits in the early 17th century. The church had undergone many repairs and reconstruction, with the last reconstruction done in the 1950s. It is the first Mission and Mother house of Filipino Sacramentinos, making it as the center of Congregation Activities and events

The church façade is topped with a statue of Our Lady of the Pillar, the patroness of the church, whose feast is held every 3rd Sunday of October. On December 7, 2017, Pope Francis granted the Canonical coronation of the venerated image. The current parish priest is Fr. Rudsend P. Paragas, SSS.

On June 3, 2018, as part of the Church-wide celebrations of Corpus Christi, it was officially raised to an Archdiocesan Shrine by the decree of the then-Archbishop of Manila, Luis Antonio Cardinal Tagle, in the Archdiocese-wide holiday mass held in the church.

Architecture 
The Jesuits built the first Catholic church in the area where the present Santa Cruz Parish stands on June 20, 1619. The original church design was made of stone and wood. The Jesuits enshrined the image of Our Lady of Pilar in 1643 to serve the predominantly Chinese residents in the area. The first church was made of stone and wood was built in the 17th century. On June 3, 1863, an earthquake destroyed the church. Fr. Agustin de Mendoza began reconstruction work on the church in 1868.

The church facade is characteristically Baroque with Ionic piers vertically dividing the first two levels in three parts. Three semicircular arch doorways form as main entrance to the church. A Celtic-like window flanked by small semicircular windows is found at the center of the second level. Forming as the pediment, the topmost level has its raking cornice in undulating liens emanating from the broken pediment found above the statued niche. The domed belfry rises on the right in six levels.

The original structure of the church was twice damaged by earthquakes and then completely destroyed during the Battle of Manila. The present building of the church, reconstructed in 1957, was designed to reflect the Spanish baroque style that Resembles, Architectural style of Spanish missions in California. Art Deco and Romanesque influences the Interior of the Church.

Notable priest(s)
Saint
 St. Ezequiél Moreno, O.A.R. He served as a Parish Priest when the Augustinian Recollects administered the parish.

Blessed
Blessed Julian Moreno, O.A.R. Brother of St. Ezequeil Moreno, O.A.R.

Gallery

See also
 List of Jesuit sites

References 
Notes

Bibliography

 

Roman Catholic churches in Manila
Buildings and structures in Santa Cruz, Manila
Cultural Properties of the Philippines in Metro Manila
Spanish Colonial architecture in the Philippines
Baroque architecture in the Philippines
Roman Catholic shrines in the Philippines
Churches in the Roman Catholic Archdiocese of Manila